Sri Guru Granth Sahib World University is a private university in Fatehgarh Sahib, Punjab, India. It was established under Punjab State Act 20/2008 (Sri Guru Granth Sahib World University Act) and is recognized by UGC under section 2(f) of the UGC Act, 1956. Sardar Prakash Singh Badal (Chief Minister of Punjab) announced the setting up of Sri Guru Granth Sahib World University at Fatehgarh Sahib, the holy place of martyrs, on the occasion of the fourth centenary celebrations of the compilation and the first installation of Sri Adi (Guru) Granth Sahib in 2004.

Academics

The academic year consists of two semesters with final examinations in the months of May and December. The curriculum is based on industry experience, collaborative research, and hands-on lab courses. An advisory committee of industrialists and chief operating officers provides insights for formulating the curriculum to make the students industry ready. Academicians from institutions including Massey University (New York), London School of Economics & Political Science, and University of Cambridge (UK) visit the campus to interact with the students as guest faculty on a regular basis.

With the mandate to focus on intensive study, research and training, major academic thrust areas are world religions, arts and humanities, social sciences, pure and applied sciences, engineering sciences, medical sciences, commerce & management and sports. To produce "global professionals", the university is also focusing on emerging technologies including biotechnology, nanotechnology, information technology, environmental science, and agriculture science.

The students are provided with opportunities for internships, community service, on-campus jobs, and research opportunities.

National and international conferences, faculty development programmes and workshops for students are organized on regular basis where faculty and students participate from within and outside the country.

Publications
The university publishes three research journals in the fields of Sikh studies, religious studies and management. 
 Journal of Sri Guru Granth Sahib Studies
 The Journal of Religion and Sikh Studies
 University Journal of Management and Commerce (UJMC)

International MoUs
 University of Cambridge (UK)
 Xi’an Jiaotong University (China)
 Rovira i Virgili University (Spain)

Placements
The university has a dedicated Training and Placement Cell to collaborate industry and academia. To make the students industry-ready, regular training sessions are conducted which include the activities like GDs, role plays, mock interviews, reasoning tests, industrial visits, etc. Campus drives are held regularly and in the last years many reputed companies like Axis Bank, Deutsche Bank, Tata Docomo, Mozilla, Accrete Globus Technology, Catalyst One, Impinge Solution, etc. have recruited our budding professionals to fill their needs.

Scholarships and aid schemes
The university provides scholarships for the needy and meritorious students. Ten percent needy and meritorious students in each course are provided tuition fee waiver and Sikh girl students from Kashmir are offered free education, meals and residence. The following scholarships are provided:
 Sri Guru Granth Sahib Scholarship
 SGPC-Cambridge Scholarship
 SGPC Scholarship for Sikh Girls from Kashmir
 OBC Scholarship
 SC Scholarship

Schools and programmes

School of Sri Guru Granth Sahib Studies
 M.A. Religious Studies
 M.A. Sikh Studies

School of Basic and Applied Sciences
 BSc Mathematics (Hons. School) 
 MSc Mathematics (Hons. School)
 MSc Mathematics 
 BSc Physics (Hons. School)
 MSc Physics (Hons. School)
 MSc Physics 
 BSc Chemistry (Hons. School)
 MSc Chemistry (Hons. School)
 MSc Chemistry 
 BSc Agriculture (Hons., 4 years)
 MSc Agriculture 
 MSc Zoology 
 MSc Botany 
 MSc Environmental Science 
 BCA
 MCA 
 PGDCA

School of Engineering
 BTech Computer Science & Engg.
 MTech.Computer Science & Engg. (Integrated 5 yr.)
 MTech Computer Science & Engg. 
 BTech.Mechanical Engg.
 MTech.Mechanical Engg. (Integrated 5 yr.)
 BTech Electronics & Communication Engg. 
 MTech Electronics & Communication Engg. (Integrated, 5-year)
 MTech Electronics & Communication Engg. 
 School of Commerce and Management
 B.Com. (Hons.)
 BBA
 MBA
 M.Com.

School of Economics
 B.A. Economics (Hons.)
 M.A. Economics

School of Languages & Literature
 M.A. English
 M.A. Punjabi

School of Performing Arts
 M.A. Music (Vocal)

School of Social Sciences
 Bachelor's in Library and Information Science
 Masters in Library and Information Science
 B.A. Social Sciences (Hons.)
 M.A. Political Science
 M.A. Psychology
 M.A. History
 M.A. Sociology

School of Education & Sports Technology
 B.P. Ed. (2 yr.) 
 B.P.E.S. (3 yr.)

School of Emerging Technologies
 BTech Biotechnology
 MTech Biotechnology (Integrated 5 yr.)
 MTech Biotechnology (2 yr.)
 MSc Biotechnology (2 yr.)
 BTech Nanotechnology
 MTech.Nanotechnology (Integrated 5 yr.)
 MTech Nanotechnology (2 yr.)
 BTech Food Processing Tech.
 MTech Food Processing Tech. (Integrated 5 yr.)
 MSc Food Processing Technology (2 yr.)

School of Physiotherapy and Medical Sciences
 Bachelor of Physiotherapy ( years)

Research
The faculty conducts research activities. Many projects have been granted to the faculty by government bodies like DST and BRNS.

Students are provided with the opportunities of internships, community service, on-campus job avenues, and research opportunities. Many students are pursuing research in national and international academic institutions like University of Alabama (United States), Xi'an Jiaotong University (China), National Institute for Materials Science (Japan), DRDO, CSIO, IITs and BARC.

Research centres
 Guru Nanak Dev Centre for Sikh Music
 Guru Arjan Dev Centre for Guru Granth Sahib Studies
 Bhai Gurdas Centre for Sikh Studies

Student life
Bhai Nand Lal Library is equipped with more than 25,000 books, 50 research journals, and a number of online journals. The university provides separate hostel facilities for boys and girls. University students participate in sports and cultural events at national and international levels. In past students have brought many laurels to the university through their participation in different sports events. 'Pargaas' is annual cultural event of the university in which students from around the country participate in academic and non-academic events.

Centre for Competitive Exams
To prepare the Punjabi youth for civil services and other competitive examinations, the university has set up the Bhai Kahn Singh Nabha Centre for Competitive Examinations.

Student Clubs
For the collaborative initiatives in extracurricular activities and overall personality development of students, following clubs have been formed:
 Bhagat Puran Singh Eco Club
 Genesis Business Club
 Narinder Singh Kapany Engineers Club
 Dr. Bhai Vir Singh Literary Club
 Amrita Shergill Photographic Club
 General Hari Singh Nalwa Mountaineering and Adventure Club
 University Sports Club
 Sobha Singh Fine Arts Club
 Mohinder Singh Randhawa Heritage Club
 Hargobind Khurana Science Club
 Nora Richards Theatre Club
 Ramanujan Maths Club
 Bhai Ghanaiya Social Welfare Club

References

External links
Official website

Fatehgarh Sahib
Universities in Punjab, India
2004 establishments in Punjab, India
Educational institutions established in 2004